Rivane Neuenschwander (born 1967) is a Brazilian artist. She is known for work that explores language, nature, geography, the passing of time and social interactions. At times her works are interactive, involving viewers in spontaneous and participatory actions. In her installations, films and photographs, Rivane Neuenschwander employs fragile unassuming materials to create aesthetic experiences, a process she describes as "ethereal materialism".

Biography 
Neuenschwander was born in 1967 in Belo Horizonte, Minas Gerais. She graduated from the Federal University of Minas Gerais in 1993 and completed her MFA at the Royal College of Art in London 1998. After graduation she traveled to Italy, Germany, Spain and Sweden. She is the sister of Sergio Neuenschwander, with whom she collaborates. She is of Swiss descent. She lives in Brazil.

In 2004, she was short-listed for the Hugo Boss Prize. In 2013 she received the Yanghyun Prize.

Neuenschwander has exhibited her work internationally throughout the past twenty years. In 2010, the New Museum in New York presented Rivane Neuenschwander: A Day Like Any Other, a survey exhibition that traveled to the Mildred Lane Kemper Art Museum in St. Louis, followed by the Scottsdale Museum of Contemporary Art in Arizona, Miami Art Museum, and the Irish Museum of Modern Art in Dublin through 2012.

She has  participated in the 2008 Carnegie International, the 1997 Istanbul Biennial, the 1998, 2006, and 2008 São Paulo Art Biennial, and the 2003 and 2005 Venice Biennale.

References 

1967 births
Living people
20th-century Brazilian women artists
21st-century Brazilian women artists
21st-century Brazilian artists
Brazilian people of Swiss-German descent
People from Belo Horizonte
Brazilian contemporary artists